There are several municipalities in Mexico called Ocampo:

 Ocampo Municipality, Chihuahua 
 Ocampo Municipality, Coahuila
 Ocampo Municipality, Durango
 Ocampo Municipality, Guanajuato
 Ocampo Municipality, Michoacán
 Ocampo Municipality, Tamaulipas

See also
Ocampo (disambiguation)

Municipality name disambiguation pages